The Rosie Awards is the name given to the Alberta Film and Television Awards, presented annually by Alberta Media Production Industries Association (AMPIA).  AMPIA is non-profit professional association that supports its members by encouraging the development of the film industry in the province of Alberta.  There are 23 Class awards and 33 Craft categories.  The first awards show was held in 1974.

Categories
References:

Class categories
Best Documentary Series
Best Documentary Under 30 Minutes
Best Documentary Over 30 Minutes
Best Dramatic Series
Best Dramatic Feature Made-For-TV Movie 
Best Children's Program or Series
Best News Feature
Best Information or Lifestyle Series
Best Television Commercial Under $50K
Best Television Commercial Over $50K
Best Public Service or Not-For-Profit Production
Best Corporate Production
Best Promotional Production
Best Musical Program or Variety Program
Best Music Video
Best Fiction Web Series
Best Web Series Non-Fiction 
Best Digital or Interactive Project
Best Short Dramatic
Best Short Non-Fiction
Best Sports Event Production
Best Production Reflecting Cultural Diversity
Best Student Production

Craft categories
Best Director (Drama Under 30 Minutes)
Best Director (Drama OVER 30 MINUTES)
Best Director (Non-Fiction Under 30 Minutes)
Best Director (Non-Fiction Over 30 Minutes)
Best Performance by an Alberta Actor
Best Performance BY AN Alberta Actress
Best Television Host
Best Narrator 
Best Screenwriter (Drama Under 30 Minutes)
Best Screenwriter (Drama Over 30 Minutes)
Best Screenwriter (Non-Fiction Under 30 Minutes)
Best Screenwriter (Non-Fiction Over 30 Minutes)
Best Cinematographer (Drama Under 30 Minutes)
Best Cinematographer (Drama Over 30 Minutes)
Best Cinematographer (Non-Fiction Under 30 Minutes)
Best Cinematographer (Non-Fiction Over 30 Minutes)
Best Editor (Drama Under 30 Minutes)
Best Editor (Drama Over 30 Minutes)
Best Editor (Non-Fiction Under 30 Minutes)
Best Editor (Non-Fiction Over 30 Minutes)
Best Overall Sound (Drama Under 30 Minutes)
Best Overall Sound (Drama Over 30 Minutes)
Best Overall Sound (Non-Fiction Under 30 Minutes)
Best Overall Sound (Non-Fiction Over 30 Minutes)
Best Original Musical Score (Drama Under 30 Minutes)
Best Original Musical Score (Drama Over 30 Minutes)
Best Original Musical Score (Non-Fiction Under 30 Minutes)
Best Original Musical Score (Non-Fiction Over 30 Minutes)
Best Production Designer/Art Director
Best Costume Designer
Best Make-Up & Hair Artist(s)
Best Visual Effects
Best Animator/Motion Graphic Artist(s)

See also

 Canadian television awards

References

External links
 AMPIA

Canadian television awards
Canadian film awards
Awards established in 1974
Cinema of Alberta